For the 1936 Vuelta a España, the field consisted of 53 riders; 26 finished the race.

By rider

References

1936 Vuelta a España
1936